Stanhopea haseloffiana is a species of orchid endemic to northeastern Peru.

References

External links 

haseloffiana
Endemic orchids of Peru